Deh Divan or Deh-e Divan may refer to:
 Deh Divan, Jiroft
 Deh Divan, Rabor